Ajai Kumar Srivastava is an Indian judge who is serving as the Sitting Judge and Registrar general of Allahabad High Court.

Personal life 
He was born on 1 June 1963 in Gorakhpur and became Judge in March 2021 and will retire in 2025.

References 

1963 births
Living people
People from Gorakhpur
Judges of the Allahabad High Court